The Tazama Pipeline, also Tanzania–Zambia Crude Oil Pipeline, is a  long crude oil pipeline from the port of Dar-es-Salaam, Tanzania, to the Indeni Petroleum Refinery in Ndola, Zambia.

Location
The Tazama pipeline extends from the Indian Ocean port of Dar es Salaam, in Tanzania to the industrial city of Ndola, Zambia, in the Copperbelt Province, close to the border with the Democratic Republic of the Congo. The pipeline travels approximately 1060 miles (1,710 kilometers).

Overview
The Tazama Crude Oil Pipeline was constructed to transport crude oil from the port of Dar-es-Salaam into landlocked Zambia, at an affordable, sustainable economic cost. When installed in 1968, the pipeline had a carrying capacity of  annually. By 2002, carrying capacity had deteriorated to  annually.

There are seven pump stations in total between Dar-es-Salaam and Ndola; five stations in Tanzania and two in Zambia.

Ownership
The pipeline is owned and operated by a company called Tazama Pipelines Limited, with headquarters in Ndola Zambia and an office in Dar es Salaam, Tanzania.  TAZAMA stands for Tanzania Zambia Mafuta. "Mafuta" means "Oil" in Kiswahili. The table below illustrates the shareholding in the shares of stock of Tazama Pipelines Limited.

Operation
Due to age and lack of regular maintenance, the Tazama pipeline suffers corrosion and develops leaks from time to time. Repair of those leaks is necessary to avoid environmental degradation.

Due to inability by Tazama Pipeline and Indeni Petroleum Refinery to supply all the refined petroleum products that Zambia requires, in the desired quantities, the government of Zambia and that of Tanzania, are contemplating building a  refined petroleum products pipeline at an estimated cost of US$1.5 billion. No timeframe has been given.

References

External links
 Official Website

Infrastructure completed in 1968
Oil pipelines in Tanzania
Oil pipelines in Zambia
Tanzania–Zambia relations
1968 establishments in Tanzania
1968 establishments in Zambia